Wenallt is the name of several locations in Wales.

Villages
Wenallt, a hamlet in the community of Trawsgoed, Ceredigion,
Pen-y-wenallt, a hamlet near Cenarth in Ceredigion

Hills and mountains
Gallt y Wenallt, a subsidiary summit of Y Lliwedd in Snowdonia
Wenallt Hill, in Cardiff

Other uses
Wenallt Camp, an Iron Age enclosure in Cardiff
Wenallt Formation, a geological formation near Garth in Powys